Matúš Chropovský (born 3 June 2002) is a Slovak footballer who plays for ViOn Zlaté Moravce as a goalkeeper.

Club career

FK Senica
Chropovský made his professional Fortuna Liga debut for FK Senica against AS Trenčín on 19 March 2022.

ViOn Zlaté Moravce
In June 2022, following Senica's dismissal from the Fortuna Liga due to financial and licensing issues, Chropovský signed a two-year contract with ViOn Zlaté Moravce.

References

External links
 FK Senica official club profile 
 Futbalnet profile 
 
 

2002 births
Living people
Sportspeople from Skalica
Slovak footballers
Association football goalkeepers
FK Senica players
FC ViOn Zlaté Moravce players
Slovak Super Liga players